The Asa Ellis House is a historic house located at 158 Auburn Street, Cambridge, Massachusetts.

Description 
It is a two-story wood-frame structure, five bays wide, with a shallow-pitch hip roof. It was built in 1805, and is a rare surviving Federal-style building from the first construction boom in the Cambridgeport area. This development phase resulted from the 1793 construction of the first West Boston Bridge; most of the construction was relatively modest vernacular housing such as this one.

The house was listed on the National Register of Historic Places on June 30, 1983.

See also
National Register of Historic Places listings in Cambridge, Massachusetts

References

External links
 Cambridge Historical Society

Houses completed in 1805
Houses on the National Register of Historic Places in Cambridge, Massachusetts
1805 establishments in Massachusetts
Federal architecture in Massachusetts